Valeriy Nikolayevich Brumel (14 April 1942 – 26 January 2003) was a Russian high jumper. The 1964 Olympic champion and multiple world record holder, he is regarded as one of the greatest athletes ever to compete in the high jump. His international career was ended by a motorcycle crash in 1965.

Early life and education
Brumel was born in a far eastern Siberian village to a family of geologists exploring the region. They later moved to Luhansk and taught at a local university.

Athletic career
Brumel took up the high jump at age 12 in Lugansk, coached by P. S. Shtein. Aged 16 he cleared  using the then dominant straight-leg straddle technique. He improved his skills under the coaching of V. M. Dyachkov in Moscow. In 1960 he broke the USSR record, and was selected to the Olympic team. At the 1960 Summer Olympics, he cleared the same height as the winner Robert Shavlakadze, but made more attempts and thus was awarded a silver medal. 

He also won the high jump at the 1961 and 1963 Universiade, 1962 European Championships, the 1964 Summer Olympics and the USSR Championships of 1961–1963.

After going undefeated during the 1965 season, Brumel suffered a multiple fracture in his right foot in a motorcycle crash, and faced an amputation. He was operated on successfully by professor Gavriil Ilizarov with a new leg-lengthening procedure using his external fixator. Yet even after 29 surgeries, he could not fully recover. He retired in 1970 after jumping  at local competitions.

Retirement from athletics
In retirement Brumel turned to acting and writing. He starred in the film Sport, Sport, Sport (1970) and wrote the script for Pravo na pryzhok (The right on a jump, 1973). He also wrote numerous novels and plays, including the novel Don't Change Yourself (1979), which was translated into seven languages, and the libretto to Rauf Hajiyev's operetta Golden Caravel (Золотая каравелла).

Personal life
Brumel had two brothers, Oleg (1944–2005) and Igor, a Russian politician born in 1952 in Rostov. Brumel was married three times. His first wife, Marina, was a gymnastics instructor. She left him with a son in 1965, when Brumel was recovering from his motorcycle crash. In 1973 Brumel married Yelena Petushkova, an equestrian and 1972 Olympic champion in dressage. The couple divorced 18 months later, citing irreconcilable differences. They had a daughter, Vlada Petushkova, born in 1974, who was raised by her mother. In 1992 Brumel married Svetlana Belousova, who later founded and managed the Valeriy Brumel Fund. They had a son Viktor.

References

External links

Valeri Brumel. IMDb
High Jump legend Brumel, dies after long illness. IAAF. 26 January 2003. Retrieved on 14 January 2011.
IAAF Mourns Loss of Legendary High Jumper. IAAF. 28 January 2003. Retrieved on 14 January 2011.
 Frank Litsky, Valery Brumel Is Dead at 60; Russian Set High-Jump Marks. NYT 28 January 2003. Retrieved on 26 January 2014.
 

1942 births
2003 deaths
People from Amur Oblast
Soviet male high jumpers
Russian male high jumpers
Olympic athletes of the Soviet Union
Olympic gold medalists for the Soviet Union
Olympic silver medalists for the Soviet Union
Athletes (track and field) at the 1960 Summer Olympics
Athletes (track and field) at the 1964 Summer Olympics
Burevestnik (sports society) athletes
World record setters in athletics (track and field)
European Athletics Championships medalists
Medalists at the 1964 Summer Olympics
Medalists at the 1960 Summer Olympics
Olympic gold medalists in athletics (track and field)
Olympic silver medalists in athletics (track and field)
Universiade medalists in athletics (track and field)
BBC Sports Personality World Sport Star of the Year winners
Universiade gold medalists for the Soviet Union
Medalists at the 1961 Summer Universiade
Medalists at the 1963 Summer Universiade
Burials at Novodevichy Cemetery
Communist Party of the Soviet Union members
Russian State University of Physical Education, Sport, Youth and Tourism alumni
Honoured Masters of Sport of the USSR
Recipients of the Order of the Red Banner of Labour
Soviet male actors
Soviet male writers
Russian male actors
Russian male writers